A mujaddid, is an Islamic term for one who brings "renewal" to the religion. According to the popular Muslim tradition, it refers to a person who appears at the turn of every century of the Islamic calendar to revive Islam, cleansing it of  extraneous elements and restoring it to its pristine purity. In contemporary times, a mujaddid is looked upon as the greatest Muslim of a century.

The concept is based on a hadith (a saying of Islamic prophet Muhammad), recorded by Abu Dawood, narrated by Abu Hurairah who mentioned that Muhammad said:

Ikhtilaf (disagreements) exist among different hadith viewers. Scholars such as Al-Dhahabi and Ibn Hajar al-Asqalani have interpreted that the term mujaddid can also be understood as plural, thus referring to a group of people.

Mujaddids can include prominent scholars, pious rulers and military commanders.

List of Sunni claimants and potential mujaddids

While there is no formal mechanism for designating a mujaddid in Sunni Islam, there is often a popular consensus. The Shia and Ahmadiyya have their own list of mujaddids.

First century (after the prophetic period) (August 3, 718)
 Umar ibn Abd al-Aziz (682–720)

Second century (August 10, 815)
 Muhammad ibn Idris ash-Shafi`i (767–820)
 Ahmad ibn Hanbal (780-855)

Third century (August 17, 912)
 Muhammad al-Bukhari (810–870)
 Abu al-Hasan al-Ash'ari (874–936)

Fourth Century (August 24, 1009)
 Hakim al-Nishaburi (933–1012)
 Abu Bakr Al-Baqillani (950–1013)

Fifth century (September 1, 1106)
 Ibn Hazm (994–1064)
 Abu Hamid al-Ghazali (1058–1111)
 Abdul Qadir Jilani (1078-1166)

Sixth century (September 9, 1203)
 Salauddin Ayyubi (1137–1193)
Ibn Qudamah (1147-1223)
 Muhammad bin Bakhtiyar Khalji (1148-1206)
 Fakhr al-Din al-Razi (1149–1210)

Seventh century (September 5, 1300)
 Ibn Daqiq al-'Id (1228–1302) 
 Ibn Taymiyyah (1263–1328)
 Ibn Qayyim al-Jawziyya (1292–1350)

Eighth century (September 23, 1397)
 Siraj al-Din al-Bulqini (1324–1403) 
 Tamerlane (Timur) (1336–1405)
 Ibn Hajar al-Asqalani (1372–1448)

Ninth century (October 1, 1494)
 Shah Rukh (1377-1447)
 Mehmet II (1432–1481)
 Jalaludin Al-Suyuti (1445–1505)

Tenth century (October 19, 1591)
 Selim I (1470–1520)
 Suleiman the Magnificent (1494-1566)
 Ahmad Sirhindi (1564–1624)

Eleventh century (October 26, 1688)
 Khayr al-Din al-Ramli (1585–1671)
 Mahiuddin Aurangzeb Alamgir (1618–1707)
 Abdullah ibn Alawi al-Haddad (1634–1720)

Twelfth century (November 4, 1785)
 Shah Waliullah Dehlawi (1703–1762)
 Muhammad ibn Abd al-Wahhab (1703–1792)
 Murtaḍá al-Zabīdī (1732–1790)
 Shah Abdul Aziz Delhwi (1745–1823)
 Tipu Sultan (1750–1799)
 Usman Dan Fodio (1754–1817)
 Syed Ahmad Barelvi (1786–1831)
 Fazl-e-Haq Khairabadi (1796–1861)

Thirteenth century (November 14, 1882)
 Muhammad Abduh (1849–1905)
 Mahmud Hasan Deobandi (1851–1920)
 Ahmad Raza Khan (1856–1925)

Fourteenth century (November 21, 1979)
 Ashraf Ali Thanwi (1863–1943)
 Said Nursî (1878–1960)
 Abdul-Rahman al-Sa'di (1889-1957)
 Abul A'la Maududi (1903–1979)
 Murabit al-Hajj (1913 - 2018) 
 Muhammad 'Alawi al-Maliki (1944-2004)

Claimants in other traditions
 Mulla Sadra Shirazi (1571–1640)
 Syed Ahmad Khan (1817–1898)
Mirza Ghulam Ahmad (1835–1908)

References

Further reading 
 Alvi, Sajida S. "The Mujaddid and Tajdīd Traditions in the Indian Subcontinent: An Historical Overview" ("Hindistan’da Mucaddid ve Tacdîd geleneği: Tarihî bir bakış"). Journal of Turkish Studies 18 (1994): 1–15. 
 Friedmann, Yohanan. Shaykh Ahmad Sirhindi: An Outline of His Thought and a Study of His Image in the Eyes of Posterity. Oxford India Paperbacks

External links 
 Islami Mehfil, Concept Of Revivalist (Mujaddid) In Islam
 Shah Waliyu Llah about the Mujaddids 
 Al Hafiz Adh Dhahabi about the Mujaddids 
 Brief Introduction to the Concept of Mujaddidiyyat in Islam